Nine Times is an unincorporated community in Pickens County.

The community was so named on account of the nine water crossings of a path over a nearby creek.

References 

Unincorporated communities in South Carolina
Unincorporated communities in Pickens County, South Carolina